, was third head of the Kuni-no-miya, a collateral branch of the Japanese imperial family and vice admiral in the Japanese Imperial Navy during World War II. He was the elder brother of Empress Kojun (Nagako), the consort of Emperor Shōwa (Hirohito), and thus a maternal uncle to the Heisei Emperor.

Early life
Prince Kuni Asaakira was born in Tokyo, the eldest son of Prince Kuni Kuniyoshi and his wife, Chikako, the seventh daughter of Duke Shimazu Tadayoshi, the last daimyō of Satsuma Domain. In 1921, he served for the customary term in the House of Peers. Upon his father's death on 29 June 1929, he succeeded as head of the Kuni-no-miya house.

Military career

Prince Kuni graduated from the 49th class of the Imperial Japanese Naval Academy in 1921. He served as a midshipman on the cruiser  and battleship . After his graduation from the Naval Staff College in 1925, he was assigned to the battleship , followed by battleship . He rose to the rank of lieutenant in 1928. In 1931, Prince Kuni became the chief gunnery officer aboard the cruiser .

In August 1934, he transferred to the cruiser  in the same capacity. Two years later, he rose to the rank of lieutenant commander in 1936 and was assigned to the Imperial Japanese Navy General Staff Office. He was reassigned to the battleship Nagato in 1937, at the start of the Second Sino-Japanese War. He was promoted to captain in 1938. His first command was that of Yakumo from 9 July 1940. He was subsequently reassigned to naval aviation, commanding air groups at Kisarazu (1 November 1940) and Takao (20 March 1942) during World War II. Prince Kuni was promoted to rear admiral on 1 November 1942, and was given personnel of the Southwest Area Fleet (5 October 1942) the Japanese occupation of Timor in the Pacific War. He was promoted to the rank of vice admiral on 1 May 1945, and remained on active service with Imperial Japanese Navy Aviation Bureau in the southern front until the end of the war.

Marriage and family
On July 25, 1925, Prince Kuni Asaakira married his cousin, Princess Tomoko (May 18, 1907 – June 30, 1947), the third daughter of Prince Fushimi Hiroyasu. Prince and Princess Kuni Asaakira had eight children: five daughters and three sons: 
  married to Prince Nashimoto Norihiko (formerly Count Tatsuda Norihiko, son of Prince Kuni Taka and adopted by Princess Nashimoto Itsuko) from 1945 to 1980.

As a commoner
On October 14, 1947, Prince Kuni Asaakira and his children lost their imperial status and became ordinary citizens, as part of the American Occupation's abolition of the collateral branches of the Japanese Imperial family. As a former naval officer, he was also purged from holding any public office. Hoping to capitalize on his close ties to the throne (his sister was the empress), former prince Kuni Asaakira started a luxury perfume line carrying the imperial chrysanthemum logo. However, since few Japanese had money to purchase luxury items during the American Occupation, the Kuni Perfume Company quickly went bankrupt. He later became president of the Japan Shepherd Dog Association, and an avid orchid grower, and held posts in the Association of Shinto Shrines, the religious corporation which succeeded the government in the control of Shinto shrines.

The former prince died of a heart attack at age 57 and his elder son Kuni Kuniaki (born March 25, 1929) succeeded him as titular head of the former Kuni-no-miya family.

Gallery

References

Books
Foreign Affairs Association of Japan, The Japan Year Book, 1939-40 (Tokyo: Kenkyusha Press, 1939).
Foreign Affairs Association of Japan, The Japan Year Book, 1945 (Tokyo: Kenkyusha Press, 1946).
Lebra, Sugiyama Takie. Above the Clouds: Status Culture of the Modern Japanese Nobility. University of California Press (1995). 
Rekishi Dokuhon Vol. 33, Document of the war No. 48 Overview of Imperial Japanese Navy Admirals, Shin-Jinbutsuoraisha Co., Ltd., Tōkyō, Japan, 1999, .

External links

Notes

1901 births
1959 deaths
Japanese princes
Kuni-no-miya
Imperial Japanese Navy admirals
People from Tokyo
Japanese admirals of World War II
Japanese naval aviators
Japanese Shintoists
Members of the House of Peers (Japan)